Might Tango (1971 - 1995) was a top eventing horse trained and ridden by American Bruce Davidson.

Might Tango was found by Robert Tindle as a mount for Bruce Davidson. The gelding had raced as a two-year-old in California before he began his eventing career. As a relatively inexperienced eventing horse, Might Tango took Davidson to a win at the 1978 World Championships in Lexington, earning the individual gold medal and team bronze at the young age of seven.

Might Tango lived to the age of 24, and is now buried at Davidson's Chesterland Farm in Unionville, Pennsylvania.

Pedigree

References

Eventing horses
1971 animal births
1995 animal deaths